Żary (pronounced   ,) is a town in western Poland with 37,502 inhabitants (2019), situated in the Lubusz Voivodeship since 1999. It is the administrative seat of the Żary County and of the Gmina Żary within the county, though the town is not part of the gmina (commune).

Żary is located in the east of the historic Lower Lusatia region, in the borderland with the Silesian lowlands and Greater Poland, roughly outlined by the Bóbr and Oder rivers. The city is one of the biggest economic and tourist centers in the southern Lubuskie region and the largest town in the Polish part of Lusatia, and is also referred as its unofficial capital. The city, whose history dates back more than 1000 years, features many historic sites.

History 

The beginnings of settlement in the Żary area date back to prehistoric times. The name “Zara”, deriving most likely from a small, independent West Slavic tribe, appeared for the first time in 1007 in the chronicles of Thietmar of Merseburg, after Duke Bolesław I Chrobry of Poland had conquered the Żary land along with Lusatia. Regained by Emperor Conrad II in 1031. In the early 13th century it was part of the Duchy of Silesia within fragmented Piast-ruled Poland. Lost by Poland, the town was chartered on the Magdeburg law by the Wettin margrave Henry III of Meissen about 1260. It covered the following three areas: a trade settlement on the “Salt Trail” running from Leipzig to Wrocław, a fortified town erected among bogs (in the area of the later castle), and a Franciscan settlement established in 1274.

The city was under the domain of the Polish Silesian Piasts until Holy Roman Emperor Charles IV in 1364 purchased Lower Lusatia and incorporated it into the Lands of the Bohemian Crown. In 1635 the town became part of the Electorate of Saxony per the Peace of Prague. The Saxon Electors also served as Kings of Poland in 1697–1706 and 1709–1763 and of the two main routes connecting Warsaw and Dresden ran through the town at that time. Kings Augustus II the Strong and Augustus III of Poland visited Sorau many times, including in 1705, 1718, 1730, 1748 and 1763. The royal cabinet minister Erdmann II of Promnitz built a new Baroque palace in the town.

After the 1815 Congress of Vienna, Sorau fell to the Kingdom of Prussia, which in 1871 was united with other German states into the German Empire. The town's prominent families included the Dewins, Packs, Bibersteins and Promnitzs, whose residence was the castle-palace complex.

Near the end of World War II, Soviet Red Army troops conquered the town on 13 February 1945. After the war, British and American representatives at the Potsdam Conference of July-August 1945 were initially unwilling to agree to Polish administration being extended as far west as Stalin demanded. After some negotiations, both the Soviet and Polish representatives indicated that they would be willing to concede a frontier along the historic Lusatian border with Silesia at the Oder-Bóbr-Kwisa rivers, which would have left Sorau in German territory. However, ultimately the town was transferred to Poland under extensive border changes promulgated at the conference. The German residents of Sorau were expelled, and the town was gradually repopulated by Poles, incl. those displaced from former Eastern Poland annexed by the Soviet Union.

Initially, from 1945 it was administratively located in the Lower Silesian/Wrocław Voivodeship, then from 1950 to 1975 in the "larger" Zielona Góra Voivodeship, and from 1975 to 1998, in the "smaller" Zielona Góra Voivodeship.

Economy
For several centuries the town was a center of a “free state”. Its residents grew wealthy through trade and craftsmanship. As early as the 14th century the town featured guilds of clothiers, dry-goods merchants, brewers, cobblers, and dyers. In the 19th century the town had become a powerful industrial center. The local textile factories, employing 50% of all area people working in industry, played a particular role in the city's economy.

During World War II a branch of the Focke-Wulf aircraft factory was moved to the town. In April 1944, after a bombing raid of the Allies, some buildings of the Old Town were reduced to a heap of rubble.

Today Żary, which is a county seat, features headquarters of many offices and institutions, used by residents of this part of the region, including the Tax Office, Social Insurance Institution, Employment Office, 8 bank branches, insurance companies, high schools, and the Lusatian Higher School of the Humanities.

Żary's border area location has a significant influence on its economic growth. In the proximity of the city (20–40 km) there are Polish-German border crossings in Olszyna, Łęknica, Przewóz, and Zasieki as well as a railroad checkpoint in Forst. Żary is also an attractive tourist destination.

Transport

Two main national roads, no. 12 and 27 intersect in Żary.  They run together on a stretch of the city bypass.  Two of the three sections of the city bypass that have been opened have significantly improved the traffic in the city. Construction of the bypass was subsidized by the Phare Fund.  Presently, work continues on the last section of the bypass, which will be completed in 2005.

In the proximity of the city runs the international European route E36 from Berlin to Bolesławiec, which soon will be transformed into the A18 autostrada. On this road, near the border with Germany,  from Żary, in nearby Olszyna there is one of the biggest cargo terminals in the country. Construction of the A18 and A4 highways is underway and should be completed by the end of 2010. The E36 on the German side is known as the Bundesautobahn 15 highway, providing a quick access to Berlin via a network of motorways.

Inter-City trains travel from Berlin and Hamburg via Żary to Kraków.

In Żary there are two telecommunication companies, having a great effect on the quality of provided service.  The city has also good coverage of wireless service providers.  It also has a fiber optic network that offers quick Internet access.

Roads running through Żary
 Voivodeship road 287

 National road 27

 National road 12

Important roads running near Żary
 Voivodeship road 350

  National road 32

  National road 112

  National road 115

  National road 156

  Motorway 15 / E 36

  Motorway A18 / E 36

  Motorway A4 / E 40

  Expressway S3 / E 65

Historical sites

Despite significant war damage, many interesting architectural historic sites have been preserved in Żary, including its medieval municipal urban arrangement.

 In the northwest part of the city there is the Dewins-Packs-Bibersteins' Castle, a huge, 13th century structure, reconstructed later in the Renaissance style. It neighbors on the Baroque Promnitzs' Palace, which was designed by Swiss architect Giovanni Simonetti. Both residences, purchased by a private investor, continue to wait for renovation. They are surrounded by the remains of an old geometrical park, with a garden palace and the Blue Gate dating from 1708.
 The Gothic Sacred Heart Church towers above the Old Town.  The church, which obtained its principal shape in the 15th century, remembers the times when the city was chartered; fragments of the wall in the northern wing date from the 13th century. Initially it was a Roman Catholic church, then a Protestant Lutheran church from 1524 to 1945, when it became a Roman Catholic church again. The Baroque Promnitz Chapel near the eastern wall was added in 1670–1672. In the vicinity of the church we can find a Gothic rectory and a Gothic-Renaissance building of the old commissariat. Today it houses a museum.
 The garrison Church under the invocation of the Elevation of the Holy Cross build in the turn of the 14th/15th centuries; originally the church of Grey Friars
 Church under the invocation of St. Peter and Paul (13th century) located in the former cemetery

 One of the main treasures of the Market Square is the newly renovated Town Hall dating from the turn of the 14th century, featuring a beautiful Renaissance portal. There are also tenement houses that surround the Market Square and some at Bolesława Chrobrego Street, which is a major commercial thoroughfare of the city.  The oldest buildings date from the 17th century.
 The remains of the medieval fortifications of the city are fragments of walls, two defense towers (the taller one of the 14th/15th centuries, with ashlars made from meadow ore, has become a “landmark” of Żary), and a stone belfry from the turn of the 14th century.
 The Blue Gate build in 1708
 One of the tourist and natural attractions of the area is the “Green Forest” located near the southern border of the city, featuring the highest altitude in the Lubuski Region (227 m above sea level).

Municipal projects

The Żary calendar of events includes many cultural festivals: in April the International Music Festival “Eurosilesia”, in the beginning of June the city celebrates with pomp the Festival of Żary, in August there is the International Plein-air Painting and Sculpture Event, the International Festival of Street Theaters, in October the Vienna Music Festival, and in December the Telemann Youth Festival.  For six years rock music concerts called “Woodstock Stop Festival” have been organized in Żary.

Żary invites to its new complex of indoor swimming pools called “Wodnik”, featuring state-of-the-art fitness equipment. Other places in the city that offer pleasant atmosphere during meetings include myriad restaurants, cafes, and pubs.  On the first Saturday of every month a flea market is held in the pedestrian precinct in Żary and the Exhibition Salon is located in the Żary pedestrian precinct near the Town Hall.

Thanks to an annual growth of revenues from local taxes and quick privatization of the municipal property, the community was able to finance several large-scale investment projects.  The city has a sewage treatment plant with throughput of 15,000 cu. m per day, and a municipal landfill that meets the requirements of European standards.  In 1998 a new water treatment plant was opened.  Work continues on expansion of gas grid, heat distribution system, and water-sewage hookups.

In 2000 a large section of the bypass and a complex of indoor swimming pools were opened.  Modernization of local roads is underway.  In 2005 the last section of the bypass will be opened.  Preparations continue on the revitalization of the Old Town of Żary.  The pavement of the market square will soon be renovated.  The projects of development of the town's pedestrian zone, park and the former military area.

The communication arrangement of the town is being modernized and expenses are being appropriated for the educational infrastructure.  The construction of the sports and showroom is underway and junior high schools and primary schools are being redecorated.  The community has benefited significantly from the funds of the European Union such as Phare CBC and Interreg.

Education
There is one institution of higher education based in Żary:
Łużycka Wyższa Szkoła Humanistyczna

Sport
Promień Żary – men's football team, 3rd league
Unia Kunice – men's football team, 3rd league
MLKS AGROS Żary – sports club; athletics and wrestling sections
MKS Sokół Żary – women's volleyball (former 1st league) team

Cuisine
The officially protected traditional food from Żary is kiełbasa żarska, a local type of kiełbasa (as designated by the Ministry of Agriculture and Rural Development of Poland).

Notable people
Basil Faber (1520–1576), Lutheran theologian
Johann Crüger (1598–1662), German composer of Lutheran hymns
Erdmann Neumeister (1671–1756), Preacher of Erdmann II Promnitz
Christoph Friedrich Richter (1676–1711), German hymnwriter and entomologist
Georg Philipp Telemann (1681–1767), German composer
Friedrich von Wendt (1738–1818), German physician
Christoph Christian Sturm (1740–1786), German preacher and author
Gustav Fechner (1801–1887), German experimental psychologist, philosopher and physicist
Ernst Kummer (1810–1893), German mathematician
Maximilian Gritzner (1829–1902), German expert on heraldry
Willy Jähde (1908–2002), Wehrmacht officer 
Friedrich Schoenfelder (1916–2011), German actor
Tadeusz Ślusarski (1950–1998), Olympic gold and silver medalist in pole vault
Józef Tracz (born 1964), wrestler (Greco-Roman style) who won three Olympic medals
Mariusz Liberda (born 1976), footballer
Andrzej Niedzielan (born 1979), footballer
Sebastian Dudek (born 1980), footballer
Andrzej Tychowski (born 1981), retired footballer
Mateusz Lis (born 1997), footballer

International relations
Żary is part of the Spree-Nysa-Bóbr Euroregion – a voluntary association of townships on both sides of the border. Apart from its twin towns, the city also develops relations with the borderland towns of Forst and Spremberg. In 2003 the 1st Level State Music School of Żary signed a cooperation agreement with a conservatory from Magdeburg. These are the only music schools named after composer G.P. Telemann.

Twin towns – sister cities

Żary is twinned with:
 Gárdony, Hungary (2009)
 Longuyon, France (2004)
 Weißwasser, Germany (1996)

Gallery

References

Further reading
 Johann Samuel Magnus: Historische Beschreibung der Hoch-Reichs-Gräfflichen Promnitzschen Residentz-Stadt Sorau in Niederlausitz, Und Deroselben Regenten Kirchen- und Regiment-Sachen, Wie auch Gelehrten Leuthen Und Sonderbahren Begebenheiten. Rohrlach u. a., Leipzig u. a. 1710 (Digitalisat).
 Johann Gottlob Worbs: Geschichte der Herrschaften Sorau und Triebel. Rauert, Sorau 1826 (Digitalisat), (Reprint: Niederlausitzer Verlag, Guben 2008).
 Johannes Schwela: Sorau N.-L. und Umgebung in Wort und Bild. Jülich, Chemnitz 1908 (Digitalisat).
 Julius Helbig: Urkundliche Beiträge zur Geschichte der edlen Herren von Biberstein und ihrer Güter. Aus dem handschriftlichen Nachlass des Generalmajors Paul Rogalla von Bieberstein mitgeteilt von Albert Hirtz. Bearbeitet, erläutert und um einen Regesten-Nachtrag vermehrt. Selbstverlag des Vereines für Heimatkunde des Jeschken-Isergaues, Reichenberg, 1911.
 Emil Engelmann: Geschichte der Stadt Sorau im Jahrhundert ihrer Selbstverwaltung 1832–1932. Rauert & Pittius, Sorau 1936 (Digitalisat)
 Klaus-Henning Rauert, Friedrich Wendig: Siebenhundert Jahre Sorau. Die Geschichte einer ostdeutschen Stadt 1260–1960. Sorauer Heimatverlag, Dortmund 1960.
 Tomasz Jaworski: Żary w dziejach pogranicza śląsko-łużyckiego. Zakład Poligrafii WSP, Żary 1993. (summary in German)
 Jerzy Piotr Majchrzak: Encyklopedia Ziemi Żarskiej w jej historycznych i współczesnych granicach. Dom Wydawniczy Soravia, Żary 2002, .
 P. Baron's Heimatkarte des Kreises Sorau. Geographisches Institut Baron, Liegnitz o. J. (4. Auflage, Reprint. Niederlausitzer Verlag, Guben 2008), (mehrfarbig, Maßstab 1:100 000, 71 x 52 cm, Stand 1939)
 Tomasz Jaworski (intro), Izabela Taraszczuk (transl.): "Żary w ostatnich dniach II Wojny Światowej" (Sorau in den letzten Tagen des Zweiten Weltkriegs, Tagebuchnotizen der Zeitzeugin Martha Neumann Soraus Schreckenstage), in: Kronika Ziemi Żarskiej, Nr. 1 (45)/2008, Żary, S. 90–96, .
 Tomasz Jaworski (intro), Izabela Taraszczuk (transl.): "Okupacja Żar przez wojska radzieckie" (Die Besetzung der Stadt Sorau durch die sowjetischen Truppen, Tagebuchnotizen der Zeitzeugin Martha Neumann Soraus Schreckenstage - Fortsetzung), in: Kronika Ziemi Żarskiej, Nr. 2 (46)/2008, Żary, S. 88–96, .
 Edward Białek, Łukasz Bieniasz (edit.): Hereditas Culturalis Soraviensis. Beiträge zur Geschichte der Stadt Sorau und zu ihrer Kultur. Neisse-Verlag, Dresden 2010,  (Orbis Linguarum Beiheft 95).

External links
Jewish Community in Żary on Virtual Shtetl

Cities and towns in Lubusz Voivodeship
Żary County